Maya Shenfeld is a Jerusalem-born composer and musician based in Berlin, Germany.

Shenfeld's work explores electronic, popular and experimental music and their intersection.

Shenfeld was born in Jerusalem and began her musical training there. When she was 20 years old, she had completed her first degree in classical guitar in the Jerusalem Academy of Music and Dance. After moving to Berlin, she studied contemporary music performance and composition at the Berlin University of the Arts (UDK).

Writing for The Guardian, music journalist John Lewis described her work as "invoking the transcendent", writing that it is "music that uses 21st-century technology to conjure up images of liturgical chants and ancient temples". The album was featured as Stereogum's number one "Best Experimental Albums of 2022" list.

Film and TV score work 

In 2022 Shenfeld scored two short films, Piazza Futura by Kevin b. Lee (premierd on the Locarno Film Festival) and The Flagmakers by Cynthia Wade and Sharon Liese., which was shortlisted for an Academy award. Shenfeld has previously written music for EMI’s production music library which is synced internationally on documentaries, drama, and radio.

Discography

Studio albums

References

Year of birth missing (living people)
Living people
Composers from Jerusalem
Women composers
21st-century Israeli composers
21st-century guitarists
21st-century Israeli artists
People from Jerusalem